Podocarpus aristulatus is a small to medium-sized evergreen tree in the conifer family Podocarpaceae. It is found on the Caribbean islands of Hispaniola and Cuba.

Description
Podocarpus aristulatus grows to 10–20 m tall. The leaves are elliptical to linear, 2–4 cm long and 5–8 mm broad, arranged spirally on the shoots. The seed cones are berry-like, with fleshy red receptacle and one (occasionally two) apical seeds 7–10 mm long.

Uses
In the mountainous regions of the central Dominican Republic, where it is known as "palo de cruz" (or wood of the cross), it is used for axe handles and pestles, because of the durable quality of the wood. Its leaves are used for medicinal teas. As part of the religious beliefs of the area, small pieces are placed above the door frame on the inside of houses as a way of warding off evil spirits.

Synonymy
Synonymy: Nageia aristulata, Podocarpus angustifolius var. aristulatus, Podocarpus angustifolius var. wrightii, Podocarpus buchii, Podocarpus angustifolius subsp. buchii, Podocarpus leonii, Podocarpus angustifolius  var. leonii, Podocarpus victorinianus, Podocarpus angustifolius subsp. buchii var. latifolius.

References

aristulatus
Trees of Cuba
Trees of the Dominican Republic
Trees of Haiti
Medicinal plants of North America